Radio Day (Den' Radio), Communications Workers' Day (as it is officially known in Russia) or Radio and Television Day (as it is known in Bulgaria) is a commemoration of the development of radio in Russia. It takes place on 7 May, the day in 1895 on which Alexander Stepanovich Popov demonstrated a radio based lightning detector.

Origins

On 7 May 1895, Alexander Stepanovich Popov presented the paper "On the Relation of Metallic Powders to Electric Oscillations" before the Russian Physical and Chemical Society in St. Petersburg, which described his radio wave based device that used Sir Oliver Lodge's coherer as a lightning detector. Popov's device was just a radio receiver, he would not develop a radio transmitter until over a year later (a year and a half after Guglielmo Marconi developed a similar device.

Popov's presentation was declared the "inventor of radio" in the former Soviet Union and Eastern Europe (although historians note it may be more due to Cold War era politics than historical evidence). The first Radio Day was observed in the Soviet Union in 1945, on the 50th anniversary of Popov's experiment, and some four decades after his death. Radio Day is officially marked in Russia and Bulgaria.

See also
 Telecommunications in Russia
 World Radio Day

References

External links
IEEE - Popov's Contribution to the Development of Wireless Communication, 1895
BBC News - Russia: mother of invention?
Calend.ru - День радио (in Russian)

May observances
September observances 
Observances in Russia
Public holidays in the Soviet Union
Telecommunications in Russia
Communications in the Soviet Union
Spring (season) events in Russia